Sai Kung North is one of the 19 constituencies in the Tai Po District. The constituency returns one district councillor to the Tai Po District Council, with an election every four years.

Sai Kung North constituency is loosely based on northern part of the Sai Kung Peninsula, also called 'Sai Kung North', with estimated population of 14,102.

Councillors represented

Election results

2010s

2000s

1990s

1980s

References

Sai Kung Peninsula
Constituencies of Hong Kong
Constituencies of Tai Po District Council
1982 establishments in Hong Kong
Constituencies established in 1982